István Szabó is a Hungarian film director.

István Szabó may also refer to:

István P. Szabó (born 1972), Hungarian filmmaker and writer
István Szabó (handballer) (born 1950), former Hungarian handball player
István Szabó (canoeist) (born 1950), Hungarian sprint canoeist
István Szabó de Nagyatád (1863–1924), Hungarian politician